List of Guggenheim Fellowships awarded in 1969

See also
 Guggenheim Fellowship

References

1969
1969 awards
Lists of awards by awarding entity